Milton Robert Pydana (born 27 January 1950) is a cricketer who played three One Day Internationals (ODIs) for the West Indies.

A middle or lower-order right-handed batsman and wicketkeeper, Pydana played first-class cricket for Guyana for 17 seasons from 1970 to 1987, and also successfully captained Berbice in Guyanese domestic cricket.

Pydana made two overseas tours with the West Indies cricket team as the second wicketkeeper: in 1980–81, he was understudy to David Murray in Pakistan and in 1983–84 he was second string to Jeff Dujon in India. On the first tour, he played in two One Day Internationals, hitting the winning runs in the second match, the only time he batted in his three international matches. In India, he played just once in the ODI team.

After his cricket career ended he went to live in the US and has lived in Brooklyn, NY since 1989 with his wife and the love of his children. His daughter Rochelle Pydana continues to keep the name in the spotlight with the well-known haircare company Pydana Collection

References

External links
 
 Milton Pydana at CricketArchive

1950 births
Living people
People from New Amsterdam, Guyana
West Indies One Day International cricketers
Guyanese cricketers
Berbice cricketers
Guyana cricketers
Wicket-keepers